Frank Bidart (born May 27, 1939) is an American academic and poet, and a winner of the Pulitzer Prize for Poetry.

Biography
Bidart is a native of California and considered a career in acting or directing when he was young. In 1957, he began to study at the University of California at Riverside, where he was introduced to writers such as T.S. Eliot and Ezra Pound and started to look at poetry as a career path. He then went on to Harvard, where he was a student and friend of Robert Lowell and Elizabeth Bishop. He began studying with Lowell and Reuben Brower in 1962.

He has been an English professor at Wellesley College since 1972, and has taught at nearby Brandeis University. He lives in Cambridge, Massachusetts, and he is gay. In his early work, he was noted for his dramatic monologue poems like "Ellen West," which Bidart wrote from the point of view of a woman with an eating disorder, and "Herbert White," which he wrote from the point of view of a psychopath. He has also written openly about his family in the style of confessional poetry.

He co-edited the Collected Poems of Robert Lowell which was published in 2003 after years of working on the book's voluminous footnotes with his co-editor David Gewanter.

Bidart was the 2007 winner of Yale University's Bollingen Prize in American Poetry. His chapbook, Music Like Dirt, later included in the collection Star Dust, was a finalist for the 2003 Pulitzer Prize in poetry. His 2013 book Metaphysical Dog was a finalist for the National Book Award in Poetry and won the National Book Critics Circle Award.

He currently maintains a strong working relationship with actor and fellow poet James Franco, with whom he collaborated during the making of Franco's short film "Herbert White" (2010), based on Bidart's poem of the same name.

In 2017, Bidart received the Griffin Poetry Prize Lifetime Recognition Award and the 2017 National Book Award for Poetry for his book Half-light: Collected Poems 1965–2016.

He was awarded the 2018 Pulitzer Prize for Poetry for Half-light: Collected Poems 1965–2016.

Awards and honors
 1981 The Paris Review's first Bernard F. Conners Prize for "The War of Vaslav Nijinsky" 
 1991 Lila Wallace-Reader's Digest Foundation Writers' Award
 1992 Fellow of the American Academy of Arts and Sciences
 1995 Morton Dauwen Zabel Award in Poetry given by the American Academy of Arts and Letters
 1997 Shelley Memorial Award of the Poetry Society of America 
 2000 Wallace Stevens Award of The Academy of American Poets; subsequently elected a Chancellor of the Academy (2003)
 2007 Bollingen Prize in American Poetry
 2013 National Book Critics Circle Award (Poetry), winner for Metaphysical Dog
 2013 National Book Award (Poetry), finalist for Metaphysical Dog
2014 PEN/Voelcker Award for Poetry
2017 Griffin Poetry Prize Lifetime Recognition Award
2017 National Book Award in Poetry
2018 Pulitzer Prize for Poetry

Bibliography

Poetry
 Golden State (1973)
 The Book of the Body (1977)
 The Sacrifice (1983)
 In the Western Night: Collected Poems 1965–90 (1990)
 Desire (1997) received the Theodore Roethke Memorial Poetry Prize and the 1998 Bobbitt Prize for Poetry; finalist for the Pulitzer Prize, the National Book Award, and the National Book Critics Circle Award
 Music Like Dirt (Sarabande Books, 2002), nominated for the Pulitzer Prize
 Star Dust (2005), in two sections
 Watching the Spring Festival (2008)
 Metaphysical Dog (2013), nominated for the National Book Award in Poetry and winner of the National Book Critics Circle Award
 Half-light: Collected Poems 1965–2016 (2017), winner of the National Book Award in Poetry and the Pulitzer Prize for Poetry
Against Silence (2021)

Other
 Editor, with David Gewanter, of Robert Lowell's Collected Poems (2003)

References

Sources

Further reading
 On Frank Bidart: Fastening the voice to the page (edited by Liam Rector & Tree Swenson). Ann Arbor, MI: University of Michigan Press, 2007.

External links
Frank Bidart at FSG
Famous Poets and Poems Web site
Poetry Foundation
Bookslut blog interview with Bidart
Discussion of Bidart's "Golden State" and Diachronicity 

1939 births
Poets from California
Brandeis University faculty
Fellows of the American Academy of Arts and Sciences
American gay writers
Harvard University alumni
Living people
Members of the American Academy of Arts and Letters
Writers from Bakersfield, California
University of California, Riverside alumni
Wellesley College faculty
Bollingen Prize recipients
American LGBT poets
LGBT people from California
Chapbook writers
American male poets
Gay academics
20th-century American poets
21st-century American poets
20th-century American male writers
21st-century American male writers
Gay poets